Animal Behavior is a 1989 comedy film directed by Jenny Bowen and Kjehl Rasmussen and starring Karen Allen, Armand Assante, and Holly Hunter.

Plot

The beautiful biologist Alex Brisco develops a new method to communicate with chimpanzees: instead of machines she uses a simple sign language. Her research and competition with ignorant colleagues lets her overlook the amorous approaches of cellist Mark. She accepts his help, but no more, because she believes he is married.

Cast
Karen Allen as Alex Bristow
Armand Assante as Mark Mathias
Josh Mostel as Mel Gorsky
Holly Hunter as Coral Grable
Richard Libertini as Dr. Parrish
Jon Shear as Tyler Forbes
Nan Martin as Mrs. Norton
Crystal Buda as Cleo Grable

Production
Animal Behavior was the final film for Alexa Kenin who played Sheila Sandusky, released posthumously; her scenes were filmed in 1984 when the project was started by Jenny Bowen. Filming was intermittent for the next four years until it was completed by producer Kjehl Rasmussen. As a result, the director's name was credited with the pseudonym H. Anne Riley.

References

External links

1989 films
American comedy films
Films scored by Cliff Eidelman
Films about apes
Films about scientists
1989 comedy films
1980s English-language films
1980s American films